Callimetopus rhombifer is a species of beetle in the family Cerambycidae. It was described by Heller in 1913. It is known from Sulawesi and the Philippines.

References

Callimetopus
Beetles described in 1913